HD 181342 is a star in the constellation of Sagittarius. With an apparent magnitude of 7.55, it cannot be seen with the naked eye. Parallax measurements made by Gaia spacecraft put the star at a distance of 394 light-years (121 parsecs) away.

The survey in 2015 have ruled out the existence of any additional stellar companions at projected distances from 138 to 762 astronomical units.

Nomenclature 
The star HD 181342 is named Belel. The name was selected in the NameExoWorlds campaign by Senegal, during the 100th anniversary of the IAU. Belel is a rare source of water in the north of Senegal.

Properties 
HD 181342 is a K-type red giant star. It was formerly an A-type main-sequence star, but at an age of 1.56 billion years it has swelled up to a size of 4.55 solar radii. It is currently 1.78 times the mass of the Sun, 16.2 times as luminous, and its surface temperature is 4976 K.

Planetary system
HD 181342 is known to have one planet, detected with Doppler spectroscopy. The planet, HD 181342 b, orbits at a distance of 1.59 astronomical units (au), every 564 days (almost 2 years). Its mass is at least two and a half times that of Jupiter.

References

K-type giants
Sagittarius (constellation)
Durchmusterung objects
181342
095124
Planetary systems with one confirmed planet